Bithoor or Bithur is a  town in Kanpur District,  by road north of the centre of Kanpur city, in Uttar Pradesh, India. Bithoor is situated on the right bank of the River Ganges, and is a centre of Hindu pilgrimage. Bithoor is also the centre for War of Independence of 1857 as Nana Sahib, a popular freedom fighter who was based there. The city is enlisted as a municipality of Kanpur metropolitan area.

History

Bithoor has been closely associated with the Indian independence movement, especially the Indian Rebellion of 1857. It was at one time home to many of the rebellion's most prominent participants including the Rani of Jhansi, Lakshmi Bai. During the British Raj, Bithoor used to be part of Cawnpore district (now Kanpur) in the United Provinces. The last of the Peshwas, Baji Rao II, was banished to Bithur; his adopted son, Nana Sahib, made the town his headquarters. Bithur was captured by General Havelock on 19 July 1857. The town was subsequently attacked and occupied by the British, who razed Nana Sahib's palace and the temples in the town in retaliation for the brutal massacre of over 300 British men, women and children who had been lured out of their defences at Cawnpore by a group of Indian rebels with a promise of truce during the Siege of Cawnpore. Angered British troops also carried out numerous reprisals against the citizenry of Bithoor, included anyone suspected of being involved in the rebellion. Numerous private houses in Bithoor were also looted and burnt.

Demographics

Bithoor is a Nagar Panchayat city in district of Kanpur Nagar, Uttar Pradesh. The Bithoor city is divided into 10 wards for which elections are held every 5 years.  India census, Bithoor had a population of 9647. Males constitute 55% of the population and females 45%. Bithoor has an average literacy rate of 62%, higher than the national average of 59.5%; with male literacy of 70% and female literacy of 53%. 13% of the population is under 6 years of age. Bithoor Nagar Panchayat has population of 11,300 of which 6,088 are males while 5,212 are females as per report released by Census India 2011.Population of Children with age of 0-6 is 1337 which is 11.83% of total population of Bithoor (NP). In Bithoor Nagar Panchayat, Female Sex Ratio is of 856 against state average of 912. Moreover, Child Sex Ratio in Bithoor is around 860 compared to Uttar Pradesh state average of 902. Literacy rate of Bithoor city is 80.61% higher than state average of 67.68%. In Bithoor, Male literacy is around 86.01% while female literacy rate is 74.29%. Bithoor Nagar Panchayat has total administration over 1,999 houses to which it supplies basic amenities like water and sewerage. It is also authorized to build roads within Nagar Panchayat limits and impose taxes on properties coming under its jurisdiction.

Religion

Hindus comprises the majority of the population of Bithoor, accounting for 89.54% of the total population, followed by Muslims who comprise 10.19%. Christians and Sikhs are in the minority and are only found in pockets of the city.

Ethnic communities

The majority of Bithoor people are from Uttar Pradesh, though there is a significant Marathi population in the city. The descendants of the migrant Marathi families settled at Bithoor have not only lived in Bithoor for more than three generations, but many of own sizable amounts of land and other immovable properties. The first five families, which came with Nana Saheb were: Moghe, Pinge, Sehajwalkar, Hardekar and Sapre. The majority of them settled in Bithoor or adjoining places.

Notable landmarks
Valmiki Ashram
Some of the most significant moments of Hindu religion and mythology are said to be created here, as being the place of the forest-rendezvous of Sita after Lord Rama left her, the birthplace of Lav and Kush, the site where the Ramayana was written.

Brahmavart Ghat
This is the holiest of the holy ghats of Bithoor. The disciples of Lord Brahma pray at the altar of the 'Wooden Slippers' after a ritual bath. Later Brahma installed a Shiva-linga which is still worshipped as Brahmeshwar Mahadeva at the principal ghat of Bithoor, the Brahmavarta Ghat. A nail of the horse shoe embedded in the steps of the Ghat is an object of special reverence for devotees, considered to be of Brahma's horse, while going for Ashwamedha Yajna. This is also known as the place from where Lord Brahma started mankind according to Hindu mythology On the completion of the yajna, the forests of Utpalaranya became known as Brahmavarta, from which the popular name, Bithoor is derived.

Patthar Ghat
The redstone ghat whose foundation stone was laid by the minister of Avadh, Tikait Rai, is a symbol of incomparable art and architecture. There is a massive Shiv temple where the Shivling is made of 'Kasaauti' stone.

Dhruva Teela
In later centuries Brahmavarta flourished as a capital of the kingdom of Utpalaranya, over which ruled the emperor Uttanpad.  His son Dhruva penanced here in order to please Brahma.  God was so pleased that he not only appeared but granted him a divine boon—to shine for all time to come as a star. The place is pointed out to be Dhruva Teela.

ISKCON Temple, Kanpur

ISKCON Temple, Kanpur is a part of the International Society for Krishna Consciousness (ISKCON) movement.

Siddhidham Ashram

Siddidham Ashram, also known as Sudhanshu ji Maharaj Ashram, is under  "Vishva Shanti Mission", an organisation run by Sudhanshu ji Maharaj. It is situated on Bithoor road. The ashram has a big campus. There is also a Radha Krishna temple and an artificial Kailash Mountain.

Apart from these, there are some other landmarks as well, such as the Ram Janki temple, Lav-Kush temple, Sai Baba temple, Haridham Ashram, Jahangir Mosque and Nana Saheb Smarak.

Transport

Airways

The nearest airport is at Chakeri situated 44 kilometres from Bithoor and one and a half hours drive from Bithoor. The proposed Rasoolabad International Airport is at a distance of 33 km from Bithoor.

Railways

The Brahmavarta station situated near Ganges river. The nearest major railway station is Kanpur Central situated about 23 kilometres and one hours drive from Bithoor.

Roadways

Bithoor doesn't has its own Bus Station but KMBS connected it various localities of Kanpur.

In popular culture

 Sultan starring Salman Khan and Anushka Sharma was shot in Bithoor.
 Mungerilal B. Tech is also scheduled to be shot at Bithoor.

See also
Bithoor (Vidhan Sabha constituency)

References

External links
 

Araul

Neighbourhoods in Kanpur
Ancient Indian cities
Cities and towns in Kanpur Nagar district
Tourist attractions in Kanpur
History of Kanpur